Uluçayır can refer to:

 Uluçayır, Bayburt
 Uluçayır, Hınıs